The Marsden Building Society is a British building society, with its headquarters in Nelson, Lancashire. It is a member of the Building Societies Association, a trade organisation of building societies in the United Kingdom.

In 2019, the Marsden Building Society increased the size of its business to more than half a billion pounds for the first time in its history.

References

External links
Marsden Building Society
Building Societies Association
KPMG Building Societies Database 2008

Building societies of England
Banks established in 1860
Organizations established in 1860
Organisations based in Lancashire
1860 establishments in England